A synovial bursa (plural bursae or bursas) is a small fluid-filled sac lined by synovial membrane with an inner capillary layer of viscous synovial fluid (similar in consistency to that of a raw egg white). It provides a cushion between bones and tendons and/or muscles around a joint. This helps to reduce friction between the bones and allows free movement. Bursae are found around most major joints of the body.

Structure
There are four types of bursa: adventitious, subcutaneous, synovial, and sub-muscular. Among these, only adventitious is non-native. When any surface of the body is subjected to repeated stress, an adventitious bursa develops under it. Examples are Students' elbow and bunion.

Clinical significance
Infection or irritation of a bursa leads to bursitis (inflammation of a bursa). The general term for disease of bursae is "bursopathy."

History

Etymology
 is Medieval Latin for "purse", so named for the resemblance of an anatomical bursa to a purse. Bursae or bursas is its plural form.

See also 
Bursa of Fabricius (a lymphatic organ in birds)
Bursectomy
Knee bursae
Shoulder joint#Bursae

External links

 Bursa
 Diagram of elbow with olecranon bursa

 
Soft tissue
Musculoskeletal system